A penumbral lunar eclipse will occur on May 7, 2107.

This lunar eclipse will be followed by the October 2107 lunar eclipse.

Visibility 
The entire eclipse will be visible in South America and southern North America. Most or some of the eclipse will be visible in northern North America, Africa, and Europe.

Related lunar eclipses 
This lunar eclipse is part of Lunar Saros 152.

Metonic series

See also 
List of lunar eclipses
List of 22nd-century lunar eclipses

References 

2107-05
2107-05